The knockout stage of the 2015 Africa Cup of Nations ran from 31 January, and ended with the final on 8 February. The matches were held in the Equatorial Guinean cities of Malabo and Bata.

In the knockout stages, if a match was level at the end of normal playing time, extra time would be played (two periods of 15 minutes each) and followed, if necessary, by kicks from the penalty mark to determine the winner, except for the play-off for third place where no extra time was played.

Qualified teams
The top two placed teams from each of the four groups advanced to the knockout stage.

Bracket

Scores after extra time are indicated by (a.e.t.), and penalty shoot-out are indicated by (pen.).

All times local, WAT (UTC+1).

Quarter-finals

Congo vs DR Congo
Congo took the lead in the 55th minute, when Férébory Doré met Delvin N'Dinga's free kick to slot home. They increased the lead seven minutes later, when after they intercepted a DR Congo pass out of the defence, Thievy Bifouma scored from the rebound after Doré's shot was saved. DR Congo pulled a goal back in the 65th minute, when Dieumerci Mbokani converted from Yannick Bolasie's cross. The equalizer came ten minutes later when Jeremy Bokila scored from Cédric Makiadi's pass. DR Congo took the lead when Joël Kimwaki headed in Neeskens Kebano's free kick in the 81st minute, and completed the comeback after Mbokani converted his own rebound to score his second goal of the match in the first minute of injury time. This put them in the semi-finals for the first time since 1998.

Tunisia vs Equatorial Guinea
Tunisia took the lead in the 70th minute, when Ahmed Akaïchi flicked in Hamza Mathlouthi's cross from the right. Equatorial Guinea scored the equalizer in the third minute of injury time through Javier Balboa's penalty, which was awarded after Hamza Mathlouthi was ruled to have fouled Iván Bolado. The match went to extra time, and Balboa scored the winning goal in the 102nd minute with a direct free kick, sending the hosts to their first ever semi-finals. The match had witnessed controversies regarding the Mauritian referee's bias refereeing in favor to the host nation, including the controversial penalty in the final minutes, resulting with Tunisian players attacking him in the end of the game. CAF decided to ban the referee for life as for the result.

Ghana vs Guinea
Ghana took the lead in the 4th minute, after André Ayew back-heeled the ball for Christian Atsu to convert from close range. Ghana increased the lead in the 44th minute, as Kwesi Appiah intercepted a missed pass from the Guinea defence to score. Atsu scored his second goal of the match in the 61st minute, when he received the ball from Mubarak Wakaso on the right flank, cut inside and curled the ball into the net. Guinea goalkeeper Naby Yattara was sent off in the fourth minute of injury time for bringing down Asamoah Gyan outside the penalty box. Ghana's win sent them to the semi-finals for the fifth consecutive tournament.

Ivory Coast vs Algeria
Ivory Coast took the lead in the 26th minute, when Wilfried Bony headed in Max Gradel's cross. Algeria equalized in the 51st minute, after Riyad Mahrez passed to Hillal Soudani to score. Bony scored his second goal of the match in the 68th minute with another header, this time from Yaya Touré's free kick. Ivory Coast sealed the win in the fourth minute of injury time, as Tallo Gadji set up Gervinho in a fast break, and they qualified for the semi-finals for the fourth time in six tournaments.

Semi-finals

DR Congo vs Ivory Coast
Ivory Coast took the lead in the 20th minute, when Yaya Touré slammed home a pass from Wilfried Bony. DR Congo equalized four minutes later through Dieumerci Mbokani's penalty, awarded for Eric Bailly's handball. Ivory Coast retook the lead in the 41st minute, as Bony set up Gervinho to score. Wilfried Kanon sealed the win in the 68th minute, as he scored from the rebound after Serge Aurier's header was saved. The win put the Ivorians into their fourth Africa Cup of Nations final.

Ghana vs Equatorial Guinea
Ghana took the lead in the 42nd minute through Jordan Ayew's penalty, awarded after Kwesi Appiah was fouled by Felipe Ovono. In the first minute of first half injury time, Mubarak Wakaso finished Christian Atsu's pass in a counter-attack to double Ghana's lead. Ghana's third goal was scored by André Ayew from a cross by Appiah in the 75th minute. The win put the Ghanaians into a record ninth Africa Cup of Nations final.

Crowd disturbances began after Ghana's first goal, culminating after the third in a 40-minute stoppage while security forces corralled the Ghanaian section from the rest of the crowd. The hosts were fined US$100,000 by the CAF.

Third place play-off
After a goalless 90 minutes, the match was decided by a penalty shoot-out (no extra time was played as per regulations). Equatorial Guinea missed their first and second penalties by Javier Balboa and Raúl Fabiani, while DR Congo converted all four of their kicks, giving them their best finish in the Africa Cup of Nations since 1998 when they also finished third, while the fourth-placed finish for the hosts were still their best ever in the Africa Cup of Nations.

Final

After a goalless 120 minutes (regulation and extra time), the match was decided by a penalty shoot-out. Ivory Coast missed their first and second penalties by Wilfried Bony and Tallo Gadji, while Ghana missed their third and fourth penalties by Afriyie Acquah and Frank Acheampong. Both teams converted their kicks in the fifth to tenth rounds, and in the eleventh round, Ivorian goalkeeper Boubacar Barry saved from his counterpart Brimah Razak, diving to his left to push the ball around the post. He then scored his own penalty shooting to the right of the net. Ivory Coast won their second title and their first since 1992, where they also defeated Ghana in the final after a penalty shoot-out, while Ghana lost their third straight Africa Cup of Nations final after their last triumph in 1982.

Details

References

External links
Orange Africa Cup Of Nations, Equatorial Guinea 2015, CAFonline.com

Knockout stage
Africa
Africa
Ghana at the 2015 Africa Cup of Nations
Ivory Coast at the 2015 Africa Cup of Nations